"Pinne for landet" is a debut single by Norwegian singer Freddy Kalas, which was released on 25 December 2014 by Alter Ego Music. The song has peaked at number 1 on the Norwegian singles chart. One year later "Pinne for Sverige" was released.

Track listing

Music video
The music video was uploaded to YouTube on 26 December 2014.

Charts

Pinne for Sverige

Release history

References 

Norwegian pop songs
2014 singles
2014 songs
Number-one singles in Norway
Norwegian-language songs
Song articles with missing songwriters